The Sydney Explorer was an Australian open top bus tourist sightseeing service operating in the Sydney central business district and Eastern Suburbs. Nowadays the company is owned by Big Bus Tours and trades as Big Bus Sydney.

History
On 23 November 1980, the Urban Transit Authority commenced operating the Sydney Explorer looping the Sydney central business district. It was operated with Mercedes-Benz O305 and O405 buses that apart from being painted in red Sydney Explorer livery and having a public address system, were identical to those used in normal service. In 1990, a fleet of six (later increased to eight) Pressed Metal Corporation bodied Mercedes-Benz O405 coaches were introduced.

In September 1998, the Bondi & Bay Explorer was introduced operating from Circular Quay to the Eastern Suburbs. It was operated by four Ansair bodied Scania L113CRLs painted in a blue livery.

In November 2010, both services were sold to City Sightseeing who had been operating open top bus tours in Sydney since the early 2000s.

No buses were included in the sale, with City Sightseeing continuing to operate its existing routes only with its fleet of MCW Metrobuses. From May 2012 new Anhui Ankai buses were introduced on these routes. Operations initially operated under the City Sightseeing brand, before the Big Bus Sydney name was introduced in 2016.

When Ensignbus sold the City Sightseeing business in 2011, it retained ownership of the Sydney operation. In 2016, Sydney Explorer relinquished its City Sightseeing franchise and became a Big Bus Tours affiliate.

Tickets
Big Bus Sydney offers 4 tickets:

- Classic: valid for 24hrs

- Premium: valid for 48hrs

- Deluxe: 48hr ticket + Captain Cook 1-day Hop On Hop Off cruise

- Deluxe Plus: 48hr ticket + Captain Cook 1-day Hop On Hop Off cruise + Sea Life Aquarium, Sydney Wild Life Zoo, Sydney Tower Eye, Madame Tussauds Museum.

Big Bus Sydney now stops at 23 different locations in the Sydney City tour. The Bondi tour is suspended due to the COVID-19 pandemic in Australia

References

Further reading
"Sydney Pass good way to explore city; can't inherit frequent-flier miles" Daily Breeze 2 October 2005 page B7
"For a fun thing to do, see Sydney Explorer" The Mosman Daily 20 September 2007 page 27

Bus companies of New South Wales
Bus transport in Sydney
Tourism in Sydney
1980 establishments in Australia
City Sightseeing